Behzad Ranjbaran (born 1955, in Tehran, Iran) is a Persian composer, known for his virtuosic concertos and colorful orchestral music. Ranjbaran's music draws from his cultural roots, incorporating Persian musical modes and rhythms.

Life and career
Ranjbaran was born on July 1, 1955, In Tehran, Iran. He entered the Tehran Music Conservatory at the age of 9, studying the violin. In his teens while styding Western classical music, Ranjbaran began collecting folk music. Following his graduation, he immigrated to America in 1974. He studied at Indiana University, in Bloomington, and later at the Juilliard School in New York City where he obtained a DMA in music composition. His composition teachers at Juilliard were Vincent Persichetti, David Diamond, and Joseph Schwantner.

Ranjbaran's music is strongly rooted in the Neo-Romantic movement of the late 20th Century, as well as showing the influence of Iranian and other non-Western music. He has written compositions for, among others, Joshua Bell, Renée Fleming, and Yo-Yo Ma, as well as a piano concerto for Jean-Yves Thibaudet.

Many of his works are inspired by Persian culture and literature. Persian Trilogy, a large orchestral cycle completed in 2000, was inspired by the Shahnameh of the 11th Century Persian poet Ferdowsi. 
He has been on the faculty of the Juilliard School since 1991.

His son Armand Ranjbaran is also a composer.

Selected works
Orchestral
 Elegy for string orchestra (1985)
 Persian Trilogy
     Seemorgh (1991)
     The Blood of Seyavash (ballet,  1994)
     Seven Passages (2000)
 Symphony No. 1 (1992)
 Awakening for string orchestra (2005)
 Saratoga (2005)
 Mithra (2010)
 Esther (2015)

Concertos
 Concerto for violin and orchestra (1994)
 Concerto for cello and orchestra (1998)
 Elegy for cello and orchestra (1998)
 Moto Perpetuo for violin and string orchestra (2001)
 Elegy for cello (or clarinet) and string orchestra (2004)
 Concerto for piano and orchestra (2008)
 Concerto for violin, viola and orchestra (2009)
 Concerto for flute and orchestra (2013)
 Concerto for viola and orchestra (2014)
 Concerto for English Horn and String Orchestra (2015)
 Concerto for Double Bass and Orchestra (2018)

Chamber music
 Six Caprices for 2 violins (1988)
 String Quartet No. 1 (1988)
 Dance of Life for violin and double bass (1990)
 Caprice No. 1 for violin solo (1995)
 Moto Perpetuo for violin and piano (1998)
 Ballade for double bass solo (1999)
 Elegy for cello and piano (2000)
 Moto Perpetuo for flute and piano (2004)
 "Enchanted Garden" for piano Quintet (2005)
 Shiraz for violin, cello and piano (2006)
 Isfahan for clarinet, harp, 2 violins, viola, cello and double bass (2007)
 Fountains of Fin for flute, violin and cello (2008)

Piano works
 Nocturne (A Night in a Persian Garden) (2002)

Vocal
 Songs of Eternity for soprano and orchestra (1998)
 Thomas Jefferson for narrator, solo cello and orchestra (1998)
 Three Persian Songs for soprano and piano

Choral
 Open Secret for chorus and mixed chamber ensemble (1999)
 We Are One for a cappella chorus (2008)
 We Are One'' for chorus and orchestra in 5 movements (2018)

Awards

Rudolf Nissim Award
Charles Ives Award

Students
James Lavino
Jay "Bluejay" Greenberg

References

External links
Behzad Ranjbaran's page at Theodore Presser Company
Behzad Ranjbaran official website

1955 births
Iranian classical composers
Iranian emigrants to the United States
Juilliard School alumni
Living people
People from Tehran
Persian classical musicians